Vadym Iermolaiev (Ukrainian: Вадим Володимирович Єрмолаєв) is a Ukrainian businessman and investor. Iermolaiev is rated as the 23rd richest person in Ukraine by the Focus magazine (as of 2020).

Biography 

Born in Dnipro, Ukraine, Iermolaiev received his economic degree at the Dnipropetrovsk College of Technology and Economics in 1987.

In 1995, Vadym Iermolaiev founded “Primus inter pares”. Two years later, the company was renamed into Alef, an industrial corporation.

Iermolaiev is ranked 4th on the list of the most influential Dnipropetrovsk businessmen and is know to be the main developer of Dnipro, according to Forbes. Iermolaiev is known as the developer, who has changed the urban architecture.

The net worth of Iermolaiev, the CEO of Alef, a commercial-manufacturing corporation, is $322 million. He is rated in the Top 100 Ukrainian rich men.

In 2001, Vadym Iermolaiev founded Alef Estate to focus on commercial construction. In 2004, the company completed the development of New center, the first big shopping center in Dnipro. In 2006, Most-City, the biggest trade center of Ukraine, was built in Dnipro. The company also implemented such projects as Cascade Plaza mixed-use complex, Bosphorus shopping mall, Enigma and Prisma business centers.

Vadym Iermolaiev is the creator and investor of Katerynoslavsky Boulevard, a cultural pedestrian area in the historic center of Dnipro. In recent years, Alef Estate has been developing such projects as Perekhrestya shopping mall, Ermolaev Center mixed-use complex, Artel shopping mall (Katerynoslavska cloth factory), Port City Apartment Complex, Boulevard on Yuzhnaya Street, and Troitsky Residential Complex.

In April 2004, the Anti-Monopoly Committee of Ukraine officially permitted The Procter&Gamble Company to acquire CJSC Olvia Beta Cleaning Products Co (in Pokrov (formerly Ordzhonikidze), Dnipropetrovsk Oblast), 25% of which was owned by Iermolaiev. In 2004, the funds from the sale of the plant were invested in new large-scale projects in the eastern region of Ukraine. Plants for the production of plastic profile for windows Miroplast, the production of aerated concrete UDK and the only in the CIS plant for the production of fittings for windows translucent structures Axor were opened in partnership with a Turkish company.

At the end of 2006, Vadym Iermolaiev sold CJSC Agrobank to PPF, a Czech financial group that manages assets to the value of more than $60 billion.

In 2012, Vadym Iermolaiev became one of the patrons of the Kiddo Charity Foundation.

In 2014, Iermolaiev lost his assets in Crimea (after the Annexation of Crimea by the Russian Federation) — production facilities and administrative premises of a company engaged in the production and sale of alcoholic beverages.

Iermolaiev's fortune in 2016 was $322 million, according to Dragon Capital Investment Company, up $66 million than in the previous year.

In 2019, Iermolaiev renounced his Ukrainian citizenship and became a citizen of Cyprus.

In 2021, Iermolaiev's Alef Group resumed construction of the Brama complex in Dnipro after a 12-year break. One of the towers, with 54 floors, could become the tallest residential building in Ukraine.

Alef 
Vadym Iermolaiev is chairman of the board of Alef Corporation. The corporation comprises 13 various enterprises in such industries as manufacturing, real estate development and agricultural business. The corporation employs more than 10,000 people.

Alef Corporation companies operate in the fields of agribusiness (Agroalliance, Sady Dnipra), development (Alef Estate) and production of construction materials (AXOR Industry, MIROPLAST, UDK). Alef is also engaged in the production of dental implants and medical instruments (ABM Technology).

The Alef Estate company has developed such well-known projects in Dnipro as the Most-City shopping and entertainment center, CASCADE PLAZA, the Bosphorus shopping and business center, and some others.

Rankings 
The Korrespondent magazine included Iermolaiev in Zolota Sotnia (The Golden Hundred) with a fortune of $265 million (36th position). Vadym Iermolaiev has been regularly included in the Focus magazine annual list of Ukraine's Top Richest People rating with an estimated wealth of:
 2013 — $245 million (70th position in Ukraine's Top 200 Richest People);
 2014 — $393 million (43rd position in Ukraine's Top 100 Richest People in 2013);
 in 2015 — 50th position in Ukraine's Top 100 Richest People in 2014;
 in 2016 — 48th position in Ukraine's Top 100 Richest People in 2015.

In 2015 Forbes ranked him as the 12th person of independent means, estimated the revenue from the real estate as ₴230–260 million.

Personal life 

Iermolaiev is married, and has four children.

References

External links 

 Official site 
 How businessman, transformed the architecture of the Dnieper
 Vadym Ermolaev Focus

Living people
Businesspeople from Dnipro
1968 births